Huijin Road is a station on Line 17 of the Shanghai Metro. It opened with the rest of Line 17 on 30 December 2017.

History 
The station opened for passenger trial operation on 30 December 2017, concurrent with the opening of the rest of Line 17.

Description 
The station is located at the intersection of East Yinggang Road and Huijin Road in Shanghai's Qingpu District. An underground structure, the station concourse and platforms are located one level below street level. Because the station consists of two side platforms, there are separate concourses on each side, with its own fare gates, customer service counter, ticketing machines, and toilets. Two adjacent passageways below the concourse and platform, one within the fare-paid zone and one outside the fare-paid zone, connect the two sides of the station.

Like all stations on Line 17, this station is fully accessible. There are two elevators, connecting the street level to the concourse and platform level on both sides of the station, outside the fare-paid zone. On the -bound platform, the elevator is located near Exit 3. On the -bound platform, the elevator is located near Exit 1. There are no accessibility features available to access the passageway below the platform, so users must cross the street at ground level in order to change sides at the station.

Exits 
The station has four exits, two on each side of the station. Passengers can use the underground passageway to cross between the two sides. However, those requiring accessibility features must cross at street level, as the passageway is not accessible.
 -bound side:
 Exit 1: Huijin Road, East Yinggang Road
 Exit 4: Huijin Road
 -bound side:
 Exit 2: Huijin Road
 Exit 3: East Yinggang Road

References 

Railway stations in Shanghai
Shanghai Metro stations in Qingpu District
Railway stations in China opened in 2017
Line 17, Shanghai Metro